The Surigao–Davao Coastal Road or the President Diosdado P. Macapagal Highway is a , two-to-six lane highway that connects the provinces of Surigao del Norte, Surigao del Sur, Davao Oriental, Compostela Valley, and Davao del Norte. It connects the Maharlika Highway in Placer, Surigao del Norte to the Agusan in Tagum. Running along the eastern coast of Mindanao, it is one of the longest roads in the Philippines.

The road forms part of National Route 902 (N902) from Placer to Mati and National Route 74 (N74) from Mati to Tagum of the Philippine highway network.

Intersections

References 

Roads in Surigao del Norte
Roads in Surigao del Sur
Roads in Davao Oriental
Roads in Davao de Oro
Roads in Davao del Norte